Tapinoma subtile is a species of ant in the genus Tapinoma. Described by Santschi in 1911, the species is endemic to various countries in Africa.

References

Tapinoma
Hymenoptera of Africa
Insects described in 1911